Constantino Mpodozis Marin is a Chilean geologist known for his contributions to the economic geology, magmatic activity and tectonics of Chile. As of 2015 he was executive of Antofagasta Minerals. He has been a member of the Chilean Academy of Sciences since 2009.

References

21st-century Chilean geologists
Academic staff of the University of Chile
Members of the Chilean Academy of Sciences
Chilean people of Greek descent
Living people
Year of birth missing (living people)